Hong Soon-Hak (born 19 September 1980) is a South Korean footballer who plays as midfielder.

He has previously played for Daegu FC, Suwon Samsung Bluewings, Grazer AK, Goyang Zaicro and Persija.

Club career statistics

Honours

Club
Suwon Bluewings
 K-League Classic: 2008
 Korean League Cup: 2008
 Korean FA Cup: 2009
 Pan-Pacific Championship: 2009

Individual
 K-League Top Assistor: 2004

References

External links
 
 National Team Player Record 
 

1980 births
Living people
Association football midfielders
South Korean footballers
South Korean expatriate footballers
South Korea international footballers
Daegu FC players
Grazer AK players
Suwon Samsung Bluewings players
Goyang Zaicro FC players
FC Osaka players
K League 1 players
K League 2 players
Austrian Football Bundesliga players
Expatriate footballers in Austria
South Korean expatriate sportspeople in Austria
Yonsei University alumni